XHQW-FM is a radio station on 90.1 FM in Mérida, Yucatán. It is owned by MVS Radio and carries the La Mejor grupera format.

History
XEQW-AM 550 received its concession on October 15, 1947. It was owned by Radio Mexicana de Mérida, S.A. and broadcast with 2,000 watts daytime and 200, later 350, watts at night.

It migrated to FM after being authorized on January 24, 2012. Grupo Rivas, through concessionaire Radio Poderosa, S.A. de C.V., sold the station to MVS Radio directly in 2015.

References

Radio stations in Yucatán
Radio stations established in 1947
MVS Radio